Kriss Donald (2 July 1988 – 15 March 2004) was a 15-year-old Scottish teenager who was kidnapped and murdered in Glasgow in 2004 by a gang of British men of Pakistani origin, some of whom fled to Pakistan after the crime. Daanish Zahid, Imran Shahid, Zeeshan Shahid and Mohammed Faisal Mustaq were later found guilty of racially motivated murder and sentenced to life imprisonment. A fifth man, Zahid Mohammed, pleaded guilty to kidnapping, assault and lying to police and was sentenced to five years in prison. He later went on to testify against the other four at their trials.

The case featured the first-ever conviction for racially motivated murder in Scotland.

Kidnapping and murder
On 15 March 2004, Donald was abducted from Kenmure Street by five men associated with a local British Pakistani gang led by Imran Shahid. The kidnapping was ostensibly revenge for an attack on Shahid at a nightclub in Glasgow city centre the night before by a local white gang, and Donald was chosen as an example of a "white boy from the McCulloch Street area" despite having no involvement in the nightclub attack or in any gang activity.

Donald was taken on a 200-mile journey to Dundee and back while his kidnappers made phone calls looking for a house to take him to. Having no success at this, they returned to Glasgow and took him to the Clyde Walkway, near Celtic Football Club's training ground. There, they held his arms (ascertained due to an absence of defensive wounds) and stabbed him multiple times. He sustained internal injuries to three arteries, one of his lungs, his liver and a kidney. He was doused in petrol and set on fire as he bled to death.

The issue of the killing quickly became politicised because of the racial element. After the murder there were reportedly racial tensions in the area sufficient to lead to police intervention.

Arrests and first trials
Initially, two men were arrested in connection with the crime. One man, Daanish Zahid, was found guilty of Kriss Donald's murder on 18 November 2004 and was the first person to be convicted of racially motivated murder in Scotland. Another man, Zahid Mohammed, admitted involvement in the abduction of Donald and lying to police during their investigation and was imprisoned for five years. He was released after serving half of his sentence and returned to court to give evidence against three subsequent defendants.

Special extradition and later trial
Three suspects were arrested in Pakistan in July 2005 and extradited to the UK in October 2005, following the intervention of Mohammed Sarwar, the Member of Parliament (MP) for Glasgow Central.

The Pakistani police had to engage in a "long struggle" to capture two of the escapees. There is no extradition treaty between Pakistan and Britain, but the Pakistani authorities agreed to extradite the suspects. There were numerous diplomatic complications around the case, including apparent divergences between government activities and those of ambassadorial officials; government figures were at times alleged to be reluctant to pursue the case for diplomatic reasons.

The three extradited suspects, Imran Shahid, Zeeshan Shahid, and Mohammed Faisal Mushtaq, all in their late twenties, arrived in Scotland on 5 October 2005. They were charged with Donald's murder the following day. Their trial opened on 2 October 2006.

On 8 November 2006, the three men were found guilty of the racially motivated murder of Kriss Donald. All three had denied the charge, but a jury at the High Court in Edinburgh convicted them of abduction and murder. Each of the killers received sentences of life imprisonment, with Imran Shahid given a 25-year minimum term, Zeeshan Shahid a 23-year minimum and Mushtaq receiving a recommended minimum of 22 years.

Controversies surrounding the case

Lack of media coverage
The BBC has been criticised by some viewers because the case featured on national news only three times and the first trial was later largely confined to regional Scottish bulletins including the verdict itself. Although admitting that the BBC had "got it wrong", the organisation's Head of Newsgathering, Fran Unsworth, largely rejected the suggestion that Donald's race played a part in the lack of reportage, instead claiming it was mostly a product of "Scottish blindness". In preference to reporting the verdict the organisation found the time to report the opening of a new arts centre in Gateshead in its running order.
The BBC again faced criticisms for its failure to cover the second trial in its main bulletins, waiting until day 18 to mention the issue and Peter Horrocks of the BBC apologised for the organisation's further failings.

Peter Fahy, spokesman of race issues for the Association of Chief Police Officers, said that the media as a whole tended to under-report the racist murders of white people, stating "it was a fact that it was harder to get the media interested where murder victims were young white men".

The British National Party was accused by Scotland's First Minister and Labour Party MSP Jack McConnell among others of seeking to exploit the case for political advantage, and an open letter signed by MSPs, trades unionists, and community leaders, condemned the BNP's plans to stage a visit to Pollokshields. The group did hold a rally in the area, leading to accusations that it was fuelling racial tension.

Police response
A March 2004 article in The Scotsman newspaper alleged a lack of response by authorities to concerns of rising racial tensions and that Strathclyde Police had felt pressured to abandon Operation Gather, an investigation into Asian gangs in the area, for fear of offending ethnic minorities. In a January 2005 interview with a Scottish newspaper, prominent Pakistani Glaswegian Bashir Maan claimed that "fear and intimidation" had allowed problems with Asian gangs in some parts of the city to go unchecked. The article also quoted a former senior Strathclyde police officer who criticised "a culture of political correctness" which had allowed gang crime to "grow unfettered".

A BBC report suggests that another reason for inaction was lack of evidence, as locals were more prepared to make complaints than to give evidence in court. Some commentators have argued the murder was somewhat mischaracterised in the media, as well as expressing a doubt that significant ethnic tensions exist in Pollokshields, suggesting that "gangland revenge" may have played a part.

Tributes
Glasgow band Glasvegas wrote the song "Flowers And Football Tops" having been inspired by the tragedy and the likely effect it would have on the victim's parents. The band dedicated their 2008 Philip Hall Radar NME award win to Donald's memory.

A memorial plaque was installed on a bench beside the River Clyde, near to where he was killed, in memory of Donald. In addition, a memorial plaque was placed on a public fence in Pollokshields close to the spot where he was kidnapped; in July 2018, friends and family gathered at the spot to remember him on what would have been his 30th birthday.

Commentary
Journalist Mark Easton cites the racist murders of Donald and also Ross Parker to argue that society has been forced to redefine racism and discard the definition of "prejudice plus power", a definition which only allowed ethnic minorities to be victims of hate crime. Yasmin Alibhai-Brown also cites the Donald case to highlight what she describes as lack of concern for white victims of racist murders. She compares Donald to high-profile ethnic minority victims, asking whether Donald's murderers were "less evil" than Stephen Lawrence's killers. Alibhai-Brown argues that treating "some victims as more worthy of condemnation than others is unforgivable—and a betrayal of anti-racism itself".

Conduct of accused
Following their convictions, the killers – particularly Imran Shahid, due to his reputation and distinctive appearance – continued to draw attention for events that occurred inside the prison system. From the time of their remand in 2005, it was known to the authorities that other prisoners had particular intent to attack the accused, and an incident at HMP Barlinnie prompted Imran Shahid to be placed in solitary confinement, a practice which continued regularly until 2010, due to the continual threat of violence against him, and the aggressive behaviour he showed when he did come into contact with others. He appealed against this measure as a breach of his human rights, which was rejected in 2011 and in 2014 but upheld in October 2015 by the UK Supreme Court. It was found that prison rules had not been correctly adhered to in the application for, or extension of, some periods totalling 14 months of his 56 months of detention, but that overall, the reasons for keeping him in solitary confinement for his own safety were valid. He was not offered any financial compensation, which he had tried to claim.

In the interim, the concerns over violent reprisals had proven correct, as Shahid was attacked twice (the second incident, in which a fellow murderer struck him with a barbell weight in the gym at HMP Kilmarnock in 2013, caused serious injury) and also attacked another prisoner with a barbell, for which he was sentenced to additional jail time in March 2016; he had received a concurrent sentence for violence in 2009 after being racially abused by another prisoner. Shahid also received media attention for cases he brought against the prison service governors in 2017 for unlawful removal of his possessions (a 'penis pump' for erectile dysfunction which was deemed to have negligible medical benefit, and an Xbox games console which it was believed could have been adjusted to access the internet), which were dismissed.

Zahid Mohammed, who later changed his name to Yusef Harris to avoid connection to the murder, was convicted and imprisoned in 2017 for another separate incident involving weapons, threats and driving his vehicle at police.

See also
 Murder of Ross Parker
 Murder of Richard Everitt

References 

2004 in Scotland
2005 in Pakistan
2005 in Scotland
2006 in Scotland
2004 murders in the United Kingdom
2000s trials
2000s in Glasgow
BBC controversies
Crime in Glasgow
Deaths by person in Scotland
Deaths by stabbing in Scotland
Extradition
Government reports
Hate crimes
Kidnappings in the United Kingdom
March 2004 crimes
March 2004 events in the United Kingdom
Murder in Glasgow
Murder trials
Incidents of violence against boys
Pakistan–United Kingdom relations
Pollokshields
Racially motivated violence against white Europeans
Racially motivated violence in Scotland
Racism in Scotland
Stabbing attacks in 2004
Torture in Scotland
Trials in Scotland
Violence against men in Europe